Éclusier-Vaux is a commune in the Somme department in Hauts-de-France in northern France.

Geography

Population

Notable people 

 Marcelle Semmer (1895–c.1944) who was a decorated French resistance fighter living in Éclusier during World War I. She was awarded the Cross of the Legion of Honor and the Croix de Guerre.

See also
Communes of the Somme department

References

Communes of Somme (department)